Sinematic is the sixth solo release from Canadian singer-musician Robbie Robertson. It was released on September 20, 2019. The tracks "I Hear You Paint Houses" and "Remembrance" both appear in the credits for the film The Irishman.

Track listing

Personnel 
Adapted from AllMusic.
 Robbie Robertson – vocals, keyboards, guitar, cover painting
 Jim Keltner – drums
 Pino Palladino – bass guitar
 Frédéric Yonnet – harmonica
 Afie Jurvanen – guitar, keyboards
 Jim Wilson – keyboards, programming
 Derek Trucks – slide guitar
 Terry And The Octo Pirates – guitar, Hammond organ
 Reggie Hamilton – bass guitar
 Howie B. – keyboards, programming
 Randy Kerber – keyboards, Hammond organ
 George Doering – guitar
 Martin Pradler – keyboards, percussion
 J.S. Ondara – backing vocals
 Felicity Williams – backing vocals
 Citizen Cope – backing vocals

Charts

References

2019 albums
Robbie Robertson albums
Albums produced by Robbie Robertson